Linda Nordlund (born 26 November 1986) is a Swedish politician who was chairperson of the Liberal Youth of Sweden from 2012 to 2015. She succeeded Adam Cwejman as chairperson after the 2012 Liberal Youth of Sweden congress in Uppsala. Before she was elected chairperson she was the vice chairperson of the organisation for several years.

Linda holds a Bachelor of Political Science from Uppsala University, and was an intern at the Swedish representation in the UN.

References

External links 
 Linda at LUF.se (Swedish)

1986 births
Living people
Uppsala University alumni
Liberals (Sweden) politicians